Aathbiskot is a Municipality in West Rukum District in Karnali Province of Nepal that was established in 2015 through the merging the former Village development committees of Aathbiskot, Aathbisdandagaun, Ghetma, Magma, Gotamkot and Syalakhadi. At the time of the 2011 Nepal census it had a population of 33,601  people living in 6,421 individual households.

Demographics
At the time of the 2011 Nepal census, 99.9% of the population in Aathbiskot Municipality spoke Nepali and 0.1% Maithili as their first language.

In terms of ethnicity/caste, 44.7% were Chhetri, 25.6% Kami, 12.1% Magar, 7.8% Thakuri, 4.2% Damai/Dholi, 2.1% Sarki, 1.6% Hill Brahmin, 1.1% Sanyasi/Dasnami, 0.3% Badi and 0.5% others.

In terms of religion, 98.6% were Hindu and 1.4% Christian.

Media 
To Promote local culture Aathbiskot has one FM radio station Radio Sisne - 92.8 MHz Which is a Community radio Station.

References

Populated places in Western Rukum District
Municipalities in Karnali Province
Nepal municipalities established in 2017